George Washington has inspired artistic and cultural works for more than two hundred years.  The following lists cover various media to include items of historic interest, enduring works of high art, and recent representations in popular culture.  The entries represent portrayals that a reader has a reasonable chance of encountering rather than a complete catalog.  Lesser known works are not included.

For purposes of classification, popular culture music is a separate section from operas and oratorios.  Television covers live action series, TV movies, miniseries, and North American animation but not Japanese anime, which appears with manga and graphic novels.

Art
Washington is among the historical figures depicted in Our Nation's 200th Birthday, The Telephone's 100th Birthday (1976) by Stanley Meltzoff for Bell System

Gallery

Documentaries

Films

Television

Television movies

Miniseries

Theatre

Video games

Internet

See also

George Washington
George Washington on U.S. postage stamps
Washington-Franklin postage stamps
List of statues of George Washington
Hamilton (2015 musical)
Valley Forge play

References

Further reading

 Bergmann, Linda S. "Epic, Parody, and National Identity: George Washington in Nineteenth-Century American Humor." Studies in American Humor 2 (1995): 1-22. online
 Browne, Stephen Howard. The First Inauguration: George Washington and the Invention of the Republic (Penn State Press, 2020) on the inaugural address. online

 Bruggeman, Seth C. Here, George Washington was born: Memory, material culture, and the public history of a national monument (U of Georgia Press, 2011).
 Cavitch, Max. "The man that was used up: Poetry, particularity, and the politics of remembering George Washington." American Literature 75.2 (2003): 247-274. summary
 Greenhalgh, Adam. " 'Not a man but a god' the apotheosis of Gilbert Stuart’s Athenaeum portrait of George Washington." Winterthur Portfolio 41.4 (2007): 269-304. online

 Jacobs, Phoebe Lloyd. "John James Barralet and the Apotheosis of George Washington." Winterthur Portfolio 12 (1977): 115-137. online
 Marks, Arthur S. "The statue of King George III in New York and the iconology of regicide." American Art Journal 13.3 (1981): 61-82. online on tearing down statues

 Marling, Karal Ann.  George Washington Slept Here: Colonial Revivals and American Culture, 1876-1986 (Harvard University Press, 1988).
 Mitnick, Barbara J., et al. George Washington: American Symbol (Hudson Hills, 1999).
 Savage, Kirk. "The self-made monument: George Washington and the fight to erect a national memorial." Winterthur Portfolio 22.4 (1987): 225-242. online

 Schwartz, Barry. "Social change and collective memory: The democratization of George Washington." American Sociological Review (1991): 221-236. online
 Tschachler, Heinz. George Washington and Political Fatherhood: The Endurance of a National Myth (McFarland, 2020) re "Father of his country" slogan.
 Young, Christopher J. "Memory by Consensus: Remembering the American Revolutionary War in Chicago." Journal of American Studies 50.4 (2016): 971-997. online

External links

  "Memory and Myth: George Washington in American Art" from Smithsonian
 "George Washington in American Art" Lesson plan for secondary schools, from Bill of Rights Institute

 
Dynamic lists